The Dybbuk is an opera in three acts by composer David Tamkin. The work uses an English libretto by Alex Tamkin, the composer's brother, which is based on S. Ansky’s Yiddish play of the same name. Composed in 1933, the work was not premiered until October 4, 1951 when it was mounted by the New York City Opera through the efforts of Laszlo Halasz. Prior to the premiere, excerpts from the work had been given in concert, both in Portland, Oregon (where Alex Tamkin lived) and in New York City. The opera was originally supposed to premiere at the New York City Opera in 1950 but was postponed for financial reasons.
The opera was also performed at the Jewish Community Center in Seattle in 1963.

Roles

References

English-language operas
Operas
1951 operas
Opera world premieres at New York City Opera
Operas based on plays